Metal Heart is a 2018 Irish comedy film, written by Paul Murray and directed by Hugh O'Conor, about warring sisters in Dublin. This is the first feature film that O'Connor has directed.

Cast
Metal Heart stars Jordanne Jones as Emma, Leah McNamara as Chantal. It also stars Moe Dunford, Aaron Heffernan, Sean Doyle, Yasmine Akram and Dylan Moran.

Release
Metal Heart premiered at the 2018 Galway Film Fleadh, where Jordanne Jones won the Bingham Ray award for Best Newcomer. Hugh O'Conor was nominated for the Independent Spirit Award at its international premiere at the Santa Barbara International Film Festival, where it received positive reviews from Variety and the Hollywood Reporter. In 2018, fhe film screened at the Dublin Comic Con. It has also screened at the Seattle Film Festival, the Newport Beach Film Festival, and the Glasgow Film Festival.

It opened in Irish cinemas on 28 July 2019. The Irish Times gave it a four-star review, calling it "a warm and witty first feature". The film is distributed internationally by Bankside.

References

External links
 
Metal Heart at Rotten Tomatoes

Films set in Ireland
2018 films
Irish comedy films